The Holy Flower (known as Allan and the Holy Flower in America) is a 1915 novel by H. Rider Haggard featuring Allan Quatermain. It was serialised in The Windsor Magazine from issue 228 (December 1913) to 239 (November 1914), illustrated by Maurice Greiffenhagen, and in New Story Magazine from December 1913 through June 1914. The plot involves Quatermain going on a trek into Africa to find a mysterious flower.

Plot
Brother John, who has been wandering in Africa for years, confides to Allan a huge and rare orchid, the largest ever found. Allan arrives to England with the flower  and there he meets Mr. Stephen Somers.

Due to a mixup at auction, Somers ends up paying a huge sum for a particularly rare flower. His Father agrees to cover the cost of the flower but also disinherits his son. Stephen resolves to sell the flower and use it to finance an expedition to Africa to recover a live specimen of the huge orchid Allan brought back with him.

They meet Arabian slave traders, warrior tribes, cannibals, and a giant gorilla.

Bibliography

 Title: Allan and the Holy Flower
 Author: Henry Rider Haggard
 Publishers : Ward Lock & Co (UK), Longmans, Green, and Company (USA), 1915
 384 pages
 Language: English
 Series: Allan Quatermain
 Genre: Adventure

References

External links

Dagny's Reviews > Allan and the Holy Flower
 

1915 fantasy novels
British fantasy novels
Novels set in colonial Africa
Fiction set in 1870
Novels by H. Rider Haggard
Novels first published in serial form
Works originally published in The Windsor Magazine
Ward, Lock & Co. books
1915 British novels